Kroum Aarab    is a village in Akkar Governorate, Lebanon.

The population  is mostly  Sunni Muslim.

History
In 1838, Eli Smith noted  the village as Kerum 'Arab,  located east of esh-Sheikh Mohammed. The  inhabitants were  Sunni Muslims, Alawite and Christians.

References

Bibliography

External links
Kroum Aarab, Localiban 

Populated places in Akkar District
Sunni Muslim communities in Lebanon